Year 111 (CXI) was a common year starting on Wednesday (link will display the full calendar) of the Julian calendar. At the time, it was known as the Year of the Consulship of Piso and Bolanus (or, less frequently, year 864 Ab urbe condita). The denomination 111 for this year has been used since the early medieval period, when the Anno Domini calendar era became the prevalent method in Europe for naming years.

Events

By place

Roman Empire 
 Emperor Trajan sends Pliny the Younger, to be governor (legatus Augusti) of Bithynia.

Asia 
 Indian Emperor Senguttuvan invades the Kushan Empire, and defeats Kanishka and his brother Vijaya at Quilaluvam (near Mathura).

Births 
 Antinous, Bithynian Greek lover of Emperor Hadrian (d. 130)

Deaths

References